Carmen Andreea Amariei (formerly Lungu; born September 3rd 1978) was a retired Romanian handballer. She participated at the 2008 Summer Olympics in China, where the Romanian national team placed seventh.

Personal life
Amariei was born in Cluj Napoca on 3 September 1978.

Achievements
team:
 2005 and 2007 winner of EHF Women's Champions League with Slagelse DT.
 2005 and 2007 winner of the Danish Women's Handball League with Slagelse DT
 2001 and 2003 winner of the French Women's Handball Championship with E.S.B.F. Besançon
 1997, 1998 and 1999 winner of Liga Naţională with Oltchim Râmnicu Vâlcea

individual:
 2007 Best Right Back of the Danish Women's Handball League
 1999 World Championship topscorer (67 goals in 19 matches)
 2000 Romanian National League topscorer (178 goals)

References

External links 
 
 

1978 births
Living people
Sportspeople from Cluj-Napoca
Romanian female handball players
Romanian expatriates in Denmark
Handball players at the 2008 Summer Olympics
Olympic handball players of Romania
SCM Râmnicu Vâlcea (handball) players